Diasporus anthrax is a species of frogs in the family Eleutherodactylidae. It is endemic to Colombia where it is found along the eastern base of the Cordillera Central and the western slope of the Cordillera Oriental. The specific name anthrax is Greek for Greek, meaning a carbuncle, a red gemstone. It refers to the red patches on the hidden surfaces of the limbs.

Description
It is easily distinguished from related species by its white belly with dark spots and red spots on the hidden surface of the extremities.

The male advertisement call is distinctive and consists of a single note about 0.06 seconds in duration. Its dominant frequency is about 4400 Hz, higher than advertisement calls of other Diasporus species.

Habitat
They seem to occur near water bodies and human settlements. Specimens have been found on a tree branch, on a trail, in a trashcan, and inside of a petiole of Xanthosoma sagittifolium. Although these frogs appear rare based on museum collections and sightings during field expeditions, acoustic surveys suggest that they can be fairly abundant inside forest patches.

References

anthrax
Amphibians of the Andes
Amphibians of Colombia
Endemic fauna of Colombia
Amphibians described in 2001
Taxa named by John Douglas Lynch
Taxonomy articles created by Polbot